The 2010 Gansu mudslide was a deadly mudslide in Zhouqu County, Gansu Province, Gannan Tibetan Autonomous Prefecture, China that occurred at midnight on 8 August 2010. The floods were triggered after decades of clear cut logging practices had reduced the ability of the watershed to absorb heavy rainfall.

It was the most deadly individual disaster of the 2010 China floods. The mudslides killed more than 1,471 people , while 1,243 others have been rescued and 294 remain missing. The missing were presumed dead as officials ordered locals to stop searching for survivors or bodies to prevent the spread of disease. Over 1,700 people evacuated have been living in schools.

Cause 

Zhugqu County was the worst hit location, where mud submerged houses and tore multi-story blocks of flats to pieces.

According to Gyurme Dorje's Tibet Handbook, the forest region of Zhugqu has, since the 1950s, "shrunk by 30% and the reserve of timber reduced by 25% due to overfelling. The sand in the river water has increased by 60%, and the water volume has reduced by 8%, resulting in increased flooding and drought." Furthermore, in this county there were between 47 and 53 hydroelectric construction projects in recent years, with 41 completed and 12 approaching deadline, according to government data. These together have caused 749,000 tons of water and soil erosion and over 3,000,000 cubic meters of bulldozed material. In 2006, a Lanzhou University report concluded that these projects have made the whole area a volatile danger-zone. The Christian Science Monitor reported that two science researchers had predicted the mudslides in 1997.

The People's Daily has argued that the mudslide was due to a "perfect storm" of natural events, including "soft" "weathered" rock, heavy rainfall, drought, and the Sichuan earthquake two years before. Authorities dismissed claims that the mudslides were "man-made".

Relief 
The Gansu province has received 120,000,000 Chinese yuan (US$17,000,700 ) by 13 August. Hong Kong and Macau both donated millions of dollars to Gansu, with Macau donating more than US$7 million, and the United States donated $50,000 to Zhugqu County. Gyaincain Norbu, China's 11th Panchen Lama choice, donated ¥50,000 to relief efforts and prayed for the victims.

Reaction 
On 15 August, a day of mourning was observed, with flags lowered to half-mast at government buildings within China and at embassies in foreign countries. Additionally, all public and online entertainment was suspended, and major newspapers and internet sites were grayscaled. At the Expo 2010 in Shanghai, all activities were canceled.  Such events are rare in China; only after an earlier earthquake in 2010 and the 2008 Sichuan earthquake in recent years have such periods of mourning been observed.

References 

Gansu Mudslide, 2010
Disasters in Gansu
Gansu mudslide 2010
Zhugqu County
Gansu mudslide
August 2010 events in China